The name Atang has been used to name four tropical cyclones in the Philippine Area of Responsibility by PAGASA in the Western Pacific Ocean, and to name one tropical cyclone in the South-West Indian Ocean.

In the Western Pacific:
 Typhoon Hester (1966) (T6601, 01W, Atang)
 Typhoon Nancy (1970) (T7001, 01W, Atang)
 Tropical Storm Wanda (1974) (T7401, 01W, Atang)
 Typhoon Olive (1978) (T7802, 02W, Atang)
The name Atang was retired from use in the Western Pacific after the 1978 typhoon season.

In the South-West Indian:
 Tropical Depression Atang (2002), passed near the north coast of Madagascar, and later moved inland in southeastern Tanzania

Pacific typhoon set index articles
South-West Indian Ocean cyclone set index articles